The Norliss Tapes is a 1973 American made-for-television horror film directed by Dan Curtis and written by William F. Nolan,  starring Roy Thinnes and Angie Dickinson. Framed through a series of tapes left behind by the missing Norliss, an investigator of the occult, it tells the story of his encounter with a widow and her artist husband who has returned from the dead.

The film was originally produced by NBC as a pilot for a television series which was ultimately not produced. 
The film premiered as a standalone movie on the NBC network on February 21, 1973. Years later it acquired a modest cult following on the independent theater circuit.

Plot
David Norliss, a writer working on a book debunking spiritualists and fakers, vanishes from his home in San Francisco, California, leaving behind a series of audio tapes explaining his absence and recent investigations. The narrative unfolds as a friend, his publisher Sanford Evans, listens to the tapes.

Norliss had recently investigated an incident reported by Ellen Cort, a widow who claims that she was attacked by her recently-deceased husband, James, one night on their estate near Monterey. Her husband, who had been suffering from a crippling disease, became involved in the occult after meeting a mysterious woman, Mademoiselle Jeckiel, who attended one of his art exhibitions. Cort says James was buried with a mysterious scarab ring that Jeckiel gave him.

That evening in Carmel, a young woman is attacked in her car, causing her to crash and die. When she is found, her skin is a dark grey, and a coroner later confirms her body was drained of blood. Norliss travels to Carmel to meet Sheriff Tom Hartley to discuss Ellen's claims. Later, Norliss and Ellen visit James' crypt on the estate and find the ring on his hand. Norliss goes to San Francisco to meet Charles Langdon, a gallery owner who had called Ellen inquiring about purchasing James's ring. Langdon learns that the ring was buried with James and tries to steal it, but the coffin is empty. As he leaves the crypt, he is attacked by the ghoul James.

Norliss meets Jeckiel, who warns him to stay away from the Cort estate. That night, Norliss and Ellen investigate James' art studio, where they find a large sculpture Ellen says was not there days before. The ghoul James attacks them. Norliss shoots him several times, but James chases them out of the studio. James rips off the door of their car as they drive away. Sheriff Hartley joins Norliss and Ellen and they find James' crypt empty. Ellen's sister, Marsha arrives at the Cort estate hoping to spend the night. When she finds nobody home, she instead lodges at a nearby motel. James breaks into the room and carries her into the nearby woods.

Norliss' research discovers a series of tunnels had been built on the Cort estate in its construction in the 1920s. Lab results on clay from the large sculpture show it includes human blood. Jeckiel arrives unannounced and tells Ellen that James made a pact with the Egyptian deity Sargoth, to create a sculpture through which Sargoth could enter the world in exchange for immortality. Jeckiel says that to stop James, his scarab ring must be removed.

Ellen and Jeckiel search the tunnels for James and find him resting inside a pine box coffin. Jeckiel attempts to remove the ring but James awakens and bites her neck. Fleeing through the tunnels, Ellen stumbles upon Langdon's and Marsha's corpses. Norliss finds Ellen in the tunnels and they emerge in James' art studio. Norliss and Ellen watch as James summons Sargoth, bringing the statue to life. Norliss is able to destroy them by burning the studio to the ground in a manner that Jeckiel had specified.

Evans finishes listening to the tape, and wonders if Norliss's disappearance is related to the incident described on it. He begins to play another tape, which documents a second event.

Cast
 Roy Thinnes as David Norliss
 Angie Dickinson as Ellen Sterns Cort
 Don Porter as Sanford T. Evans
 Claude Akins Sheriff Tom Hartley
 Michele Carey as Marsha Sterns
 Vonetta McGee as Mademoiselle Jeckiel 
 Hurd Hatfield as Charles Langdon
 Bryan O'Byrne as Mr. Dobkins
 Robert Mandan as George Rosen
 Ed Gilbert as Sid Phelps
 Jane Dulo as Sarah Dobbins
 Stanley Adams as Truck Driver
 Bob Schott as Sargoth
 George DiCenzo as Man In Langdon Gallery
 Patrick Wright as Larry Mather
 Nick Dimitri as James Cort

Production
Originally written under the working title Demon, The Norliss Tapes was adapted from a story by Fred Mustard Stewart; writer William Nolan said that he took Stewart's basic premise of a "walking dead man" and adapted it into a teleplay that was mostly made up of his own ideas.

The pilot was shot in San Francisco and Monterey, California.

Release
The film premiered on February 21, 1973. It was later released on DVD for the first time by Anchor Bay Entertainment in 2006, licensed by 20th Century Fox. The DVD, now out of print, featured theatrical trailers as bonus material. In the 2000s the film underwent a brief revival on the cult movie circuit, with theatrical screenings in such locations as Toronto, New York and Los Angeles.

Critical reception
Variety said: "Curtis directed the film with an eye to tension, and that he manages. The idea behind Nolan's script has validity, with its open dependency on the supernatural. The basic thrust, to scare, is what counts, and there Nolan, Curtis, Thinnes, and company succeed. The Hollywood Reporter also praised the film, calling it: "a lot of fun, with a new twist on the old vampire story." Maitland McDonagh of TV Guide also praised the film, calling it  "a creepy, handsomely shot bogey tale that holds up surprisingly well."

In Television Fright Films of the 1970s, critic Dan Deal called The Norliss Tapes "one of the lesser entries in the Dan Curtis canon," faulting it for its "over-reliance on dialogue, shallow characterization, an unimpressive monster and too much shorthand logic."

Notes

References

External links

The Norliss Tapes at Rotten Tomatoes
The Norliss Tapes trailer at The New York Times

1973 films
1973 horror films
Films based on Egyptian mythology
Films directed by Dan Curtis
Films set in San Francisco
Films set in the San Francisco Bay Area
Films shot in San Francisco
American horror television films
Occult detective fiction
American supernatural horror films
Television films as pilots
American vampire films
Metromedia Producers Corporation films
Television pilots not picked up as a series
1970s English-language films
1970s American films